Carrie A. Bebris is an American author, journalist and novelist.

Career
Carrie Bebris worked as a newspaper reporter and English teacher before coming to fantasy publishing. As an editor for TSR, she helped develop the Birthright setting while sometimes working on the Ravenloft, Dragonlance, and the Forgotten Realms worlds. Bebris wrote the Ravenloft novel Shadowborn (1998) with William W. Connors, and the novel adaptation for the video game Pool of Radiance: Ruins of Myth Drannor in 2001. Bebris also wrote three articles for Dragon, and did editing work and proofreading on several D&D game books for TSR.

As a freelancer, her work runs from fiction to articles in Better Homes and Gardens Special Interest Publications. Her other works include Regency novel mysteries which are based on Pride and Prejudice.

Publications
Mr. and Mrs. Darcy Mysteries
Pride and Prescience (2004)
Suspense and Sensibility or, First Impressions Revisited (2005)
North By Northanger, or The Shades of Pemberley (2006)
The Matters at Mansfield (2008)
The Intrigue at Highbury (2010)
The Deception at Lyme (2011)
The Suspicion at Sanditon (Or, The Disappearance of Lady Denham) (2015)

References

External links
Carrie Bebris official author site

20th-century American novelists
20th-century American women writers
21st-century American novelists
21st-century American women writers
American mystery writers
American women novelists
Living people
Place of birth missing (living people)
Women mystery writers
Women science fiction and fantasy writers
Year of birth missing (living people)